Portuguese sauce is a sauce in Macanese cuisine.

In Macao, Portuguese sauce refers to a sauce that is flavored with curry and thickened with coconut milk. It is an ingredient in Galinha à portuguesa, known as Portuguese Chicken in English-speaking societies.

The Portuguese sauce from Macao is considered to be a legacy of Portugal's colonization of Daman and Diu in India, and is likened to a mild yellow curry.

Despite its name, Portuguese sauce (along with Galinha à portuguesa) is a Macanese cuisine invention, and is not a sauce used in Portuguese cuisine.

References 

East Asian curries
Macanese cuisine
Portuguese fusion cuisine